Roy Burnett (6 October 1926 – 30 July 1998) was a Wales international rugby union player who also played for the Barbarians.

Burnett made 373 appearances for Newport RFC. He captained the team in the 1952–53 season and also in 1950–51 in the absence of Ken Jones.

Burnett was unlucky only to win one cap for the Wales national rugby union team primarily because he had to compete against Cliff Morgan.

Burnett turned town an offer of £3000 (based on increases in average earnings, this would be approximately £185,500 in 2013) to change codes to rugby league and join Huddersfield.

References

1926 births
1998 deaths
Barbarian F.C. players
Newport RFC players
Rugby union players from Abercarn
Wales international rugby union players
Welsh rugby union players
Rugby union fly-halves